Ladislav Nagy (born 24 January 2001) is a Slovak footballer who plays for ŠTK Šamorín in 2. Liga, on loan from DAC Dunajská Streda, as a midfielder.

Club career
Nagy made his Fortuna Liga debut for DAC against Zemplín Michalovce on 24 May 2019.

References

External links
 FC DAC 1904 Dunajská Streda official club profile
 Futbalnet profile
 
 Fortuna Liga profile

2001 births
Living people
Footballers from Bratislava
Slovak footballers
Slovakia youth international footballers
Association football midfielders
FC DAC 1904 Dunajská Streda players
FC ŠTK 1914 Šamorín players
Slovak Super Liga players
2. Liga (Slovakia) players